Longford International School is a proprietary co-educational high school in Ebute Metta, Lagos, Nigeria. The school offers both Senior School and Junior School Certificate Examinations. It was founded on 24 January 1962; it was known as Nigeria People's College (NIGERPECO) between 1962 and 1986, and Ago-Egba High School between 1986 and 2006.

References

External links

Schools in Lagos
Educational institutions established in 1962
1962 establishments in Nigeria